Ferris may refer to:


People and fictional characters
 Ferris (name), a list of people and fictional characters with either the given name or surname
 Ferris MC, stage name of German rapper Sascha Reimann (born 1973)
 Ferris Bueller, stage name of Soren Buehler, former member of the German band Scooter

Places in the United States
 Ferris, Illinois, a village
 Ferris, Texas, a city
 Ferris Township, Michigan
 Ferris Lake, New York
 Ferris Formation, a geological formation in Wyoming

Education
 Ferris Independent School District, Ferris, Texas, United States
 Ferris State University, Michigan, United States
 Ferris University, private women's college in Yokohama, Kanagawa, Japan

Other uses
 Ferris, unofficial mascot of the Rust programming language

See also 
 
 
 Ferris House (disambiguation)
 Ferris wheel (disambiguation)